The 1904 Georgia Bulldogs football team represented the Georgia Bulldogs of University of Georgia during the 1904 Southern Intercollegiate Athletic Association football season.  The Bulldogs completed the season with a 1–5 record.  After a victory in the first game of the season against Florida, the team lost five straight, including losses to rivals Georgia Tech and Auburn.  Georgia also lost its fifth game in a row to Clemson to close the season.

Schedule

References

Georgia
Georgia Bulldogs football seasons
Georgia Bulldogs football